Lentibacillus salis is a Gram-positive, aerobic, moderately halophilic, spore-forming and motile bacterium from the genus of Lentibacillus which has been isolated from a salt lake from the Xinjiang Province.

References

Bacillaceae
Bacteria described in 2008